The Dodge Rampage was a concept pickup truck created by Dodge that shared a name with a previous production vehicle that was marketed in the early 1980s. The Rampage Concept was first introduced at the 2006 Chicago Auto Show. The Rampage was as wide as the then-current model Dodge Ram and was larger than its 1980s predecessor. "The Rampage was designed as a truck for people who aren't into trucks. More of a nontraditional truck buyer," stated exterior designer Scott Krugger upon its introduction.

The Rampage Concept could accommodate a 5.7 L Hemi engine with Chrysler's Multi-Displacement System; this engine was used in contemporary production vehicles such as the Dodge Ram and Dodge Charger. Like its namesake, the Rampage Concept used front-wheel drive, unusual for a pickup truck. The Rampage also had flared fenders and 22-inch aluminum wheels.

The Rampage Concept featured "Stow 'n Go" seating used in Chrysler minivans of the time, where the seats folded down flush with the cabin floor; this feature was a first for any Chrysler truck. It was also the first Chrysler vehicle to apply this feature on the front passenger seat in addition to the rear seats. Combined with a retractable rear window and midgate, this allowed the bed space to expand into the cabin, at the expense of passenger space. Other distinguishing features of the Rampage Concept were a wide, flat, weatherproof cargo area beneath the bed and an integrated loading ramp.

References
Info from ConceptCarz.com for the Rampage Concept
Dodge.com - Chicago Auto Show News: Dodge Unveils 2006 Rampage Concept Vehicle
Detail photos of the Rampage concept at DodgeTuners.org
Edmund's Inside Line: Dodge Rampage

Dodge concept vehicles